Alfred Constantine Goffe (1863-19??) was a Jamaican businessman noted for his role in the banana trade.

Alfred was born in Jamaica to John Beecham Goffe and Margaret Goffe (née Clemetson). He was one of nine children.

In 1908 he was arrested and charged with conspiring with organized crime in the attempted murder of a business rival. This was based on the testimony of one alleged witness. Charges were dropped against Goffe due to the testimony describing him as conspiring in Italian. Goffe was able to produce witness who attested to his not knowing the language.

References

1863 births
Year of death missing